Enter Three Dragons is 1978 Hong Kong martial art Bruceploitation movie, directed by Joseph Kong and starring Bruce Lai (Chang Yi-tao), Nick Cheung Lik and Philip Ko. This also happens to be Dragon Lee`s Hong Kong film debut.

Plot
Sammy is having a trouble with the gangsters after he had lost the diamonds that his boss had ordered to bring. Sammy`s friend Dragon Hong (Chang Yi-tao) and Min Young (Nick Cheung) decides to help Sammy to defeat the gangster boss.

Cast
Bruce Lai as Dragon Hong
Nick Cheung Lik as Min Young
Samuel Walls as Sammy
Philip Ko as Kao Fei
Dragon Lee as Bruce Hong (Dragon Hong`s brother)
To Siu-ming as Ah Ming
Chiang Tao as Sammy`s boss
Fong Yau as Kao Fei`s younger brother
Lam Hak-ming as George (Sammy`s friend)
Yeung Chak-lam as Bruce Hong`s teacher
Chang Chung-yee as Dragon Young (Fake Dragon Hong)
Shirley Kam as Katy (Min Young`s sister)
San Kuai as Kao Fei`s man
Bolo Yeung as Bolo
Lee Hoi-sang as Iron Head

Reception
According to website Cityonfire  "Enter Three Dragons isn't as wacky as "Clones," but there's definitely enough unintentional entertainment that makes it just as fun." and gave the rate 6 out of 10. The movie however gave confusion to people due to the random additional fight scenes and cuts of the film. Screen Mayhem says, Enter Three Dragons might be considered the ugly step-sister of The Clones of Bruce Lee. Once again packed with too many dragons.

Production and media release
The movie was released in alternate name which gave some people a confusion with the titles. The Korean release of the movie was released the title after Three Avengers. But the thing that makes even more confuse is the movie was released in U.S after the title called Dragon on Fire which also happens to be an alternate title of The Dragon, the Hero (featuring John Liu and Dragon Lee.) which made people confused with the movie titles between Enter Three Dragons and Dragon on Fire. The U.S production was done Samuel Wall (who appeared as Sammy in the movie) however it was later credited as Joseph Lai and Tomas Tang. Godfrey Ho was co-director of this movie.

References

External links

1978 films
Bruceploitation films
Hong Kong martial arts films
1978 martial arts films
1970s Hong Kong films
1980s Hong Kong films